Microphysula is a genus of air-breathing land snails, terrestrial pulmonate gastropod mollusks in the family Thysanophoridae.

Species 
Species in the genus Microphysula include:
 Microphysula cookei (Pilsbry, 1922) - Vancouver snail
 Microphysula ingersolli (Bland, 1875) - spruce snail - type species

References

Thysanophoridae
Taxa named by Theodore Dru Alison Cockerell
Gastropod genera
Taxa named by Henry Augustus Pilsbry